Nicholas Robert Jennings (born July 8, 1965) is an American director, artist, writer, and producer best known for his work on the Nickelodeon series SpongeBob SquarePants and the Cartoon Network series Adventure Time. He has also worked as a background artist for many animated television series.

History 
In 1988, Nick Jennings did the layouts for A Pup Named Scooby-Doo while working at Colossal Pictures at San Francisco.

Accolades
In late 2013, it was announced that Jennings, along with several other members of the Adventure Time staff, had been nominated for an Annie Award for "Outstanding Achievement, Production Design in an Animated TV/Broadcast Production." On July 31, 2014, Jennings had won an Emmy for "Outstanding Individual Achievement In Animation" for his work on the Adventure Time episode "Wizards Only, Fools."

Filmography

References

American animated film directors
Living people
Animators from California
Place of birth missing (living people)
American television directors
Primetime Emmy Award winners
Cartoon Network Studios people
Nickelodeon Animation Studio people
1965 births